Dr. Velen Fanderlik (1907–1985) was Chairman of the Czechoslovakian Scouting organization Junák, and later served on the World Scout Committee of the World Organization of the Scout Movement from 1947 until 1951.

Velen left Czechoslovakia after the communists took over the country.

References

External links 
Velen Fanderlik's paintings

1907 births
1985 deaths
World Scout Committee members
Scouting and Guiding in the Czech Republic